Quando Elas Querem is a 1925 Brazilian comedy film directed by Eugenio Centenaro Kerrigan.

The film premiered in Rio de Janeiro on 9 December 1925.

Cast
Bertoli Carmelo as  Alberto 
Luiz de Barros   
César Fronzi   
Yolanda Fronzi   
Regina Fuína   
Jardel Jercolis   
Laura Letti as Clarinda 
Anésia Pinheiro Machado   
Emílio Marangoni   
Mado Mirka   
Salvador Tarantino as Benedito

External links
 

1925 comedy films
1925 films
Brazilian black-and-white films
Brazilian silent films
Brazilian comedy films
Silent comedy films